The  is a branch of the Tokugawa clan, and it is the seniormost house of the Gosanke ("three honourable houses of the Tokugawa").

History
The family was originally founded by Tokugawa Yoshinao, the ninth son of Tokugawa Ieyasu. Yoshinao was originally named Matsudaira Yoshitoshi (松平義利); it was not until 1621 that he changed his name to Yoshinao, and later gained the surname Tokugawa in 1636; the family, along with Kishu-Tokugawa family (descendants of Tokugawa Yorinobu, Yoshinao's half-brother), had succession right to the shōgun once the latter died without heir. For over 250 years, the Owari family ruled Owari Domain, the area surrounding present day Nagoya, Aichi Prefecture, using Nagoya Castle as its main base. Other residences were the Ōzone Oshitayashiki, the Aoi Oshitayashiki (both in the Higashi ward of the town), as well as the New Palace ((新御殿 Shin Goten) in Horibata-chō, Nagoya. The treasures of the Owari are kept in the Tokugawa Art Museum in Nagoya.

Despite having seniority of the Tokugawa clan, there were no shōguns that came from the Owari-Tokugawa family throughout the Edo period. Tokugawa Muneharu, the 7th head of Owari-Tokugawa family, was forced to retire in 1739 because of his policy dispute with Tokugawa Yoshimune; Muneharu was then replaced by his cousin Munekatsu. The main patrillineal descent of Yoshinao, however, became extinct in 1800 with the death of the 9th family head, Tokugawa Munechika, who outlived his two only sons and four heirs he adopted. As such, the Owari-Tokugawa family had since been kept in existence through repeated adoptions from the two remaining houses, from Kishu and Mito-Tokugawa family. After the Meiji Restoration, in 1880, Tokugawa Yoshikatsu appointed his son-in-law, as his heir (mukoyōshi, "adopted son-in-law"); Yoshiakira was later recognized as the kazoku and became a marquis in 1884. The mukoyōshi adoption of the Owari-Tokugawa happened again twice, once to Yoshichika in 1908 and the other to Yoshinobu in 1955; Yoshinobu was born a member of the Hotta clan instead of the Tokugawa.

Kenchū-ji is a Jōdo-shū Buddhist temple in Tsutsui, Higashi-ku, Nagoya. Starting in the Edo period it became the Bodaiji of the family, with numerous heads of the clan cremated there.

Family tree

Gallery

References